Almena is a city in Norton County, Kansas, United States.  As of the 2020 census, the population of the city was 363.

History
Almena was a shipping point located at the junction of two railroads. It was named by Margaret Coleman, an early settler and first postmistress, for Almena, Wisconsin, her hometown.

The first post office in Almena was established in June 1872.

Geography
Almena is located at  (39.891535, -99.708865).

Demographics

2010 census
As of the census of 2010, there were 408 people, 180 households, and 102 families residing in the city. The racial makeup of the city was 97.5% White, 0.5% African American, 0.2% Native American, 1.5% from other races, and 0.2% from two or more races. Hispanic or Latino of any race were 2.7% of the population.

There were 180 households, of which 28.9% had children under the age of 18 living with them, 42.8% were married couples living together, 7.8% had a female householder with no husband present, 6.1% had a male householder with no wife present, and 43.3% were non-families. 38.9% of all households were made up of individuals, and 21.1% had someone living alone who was 65 years of age or older. The average household size was 2.27 and the average family size was 3.06.

The median age in the city was 41.2 years. 27.5% of residents were under the age of 18; 7.2% were between the ages of 18 and 24; 21.4% were from 25 to 44; 25.8% were from 45 to 64; and 18.1% were 65 years of age or older. The gender makeup of the city was 51.7% male and 48.3% female.

2000 census
As of the census of 2000, there were 469 people, 197 households, and 125 families residing in the city. The racial makeup of the city was 98.72% White, 0.21% African American, and 1.07% from two or more races. Hispanic or Latino of any race were 0.64% of the population.

There were 197 households, out of which 30.5% had children under the age of 18 living with them, 53.8% were married couples living together, 7.1% had a female householder with no husband present, and 36.5% were non-families. 33.0% of all households were made up of individuals, and 20.3% had someone living alone who was 65 years of age or older. The average household size was 2.38 and the average family size was 3.06.

In the city, the population was spread out, with 27.7% under the age of 18, 6.8% from 18 to 24, 24.3% from 25 to 44, 22.4% from 45 to 64, and 18.8% who were 65 years of age or older. The median age was 38 years. For every 100 females, there were 93.0 males. For every 100 females age 18 and over, there were 85.2 males.

The median income for a household in the city was $27,083, and the median income for a family was $33,958. Males had a median income of $22,237 versus $15,714 for females. The per capita income for the city was $14,433. About 10.4% of families and 15.3% of the population were below the poverty line, including 20.1% of those under age 18 and 11.3% of those age 65 or over.

Education
Almena is served by Northern Valley USD 212 public school district. The Northern Valley High School mascot is Huskies.

Grades K-4 and 9-12 are located in the Almena school building, and grades 5-8 are in the Long Island school building.

The Northern Valley Huskies won the following Kansas State Championships:

 8-Man DI Football - 1986, 1990
 8-Man DII Football - 1987
 1A Boys Basketball - 1986, 1990, 1991
 1A DII Basketball - 2018
 1A Boys Track & Field - 1986, 1987, 2019
 1A Volleyball - 1993
 1A DII Volleyball - 2017
 1A Girls Basketball - 1994
 1A Forensics - 2003

Almena schools were closed through school consolidation with Long Island schools. The Almena High School mascot was Almena Coyotes with team colors of Orange and Black. The Long Island High School mascot was Long Island Leopards with team colors of Purple and Gold.

References

Further reading

External links
 Almena - Directory of Public Officials
 USD 212, local school district
 Almena city map, KDOT

Cities in Kansas
Cities in Norton County, Kansas